South Bristol Grange Hall 1107 is a historic Grange hall located at Bristol Springs in Ontario County, New York. It is a large -story, gable-roofed, vernacular frame building built in 1923.

It was listed on the National Register of Historic Places in 1997.

References

Grange organizations and buildings in New York (state)
Grange buildings on the National Register of Historic Places in New York (state)
Buildings and structures completed in 1923
Buildings and structures in Ontario County, New York
National Register of Historic Places in Ontario County, New York